Hilary Van Dyke (born October 30, 1970) is an American actress and singer who began her career in TV advertisements before landing the role of Marilyn Munster in The Munsters Today, replacing the actress in the original pilot episodes, Mary Ellen Dunbar.

Contrary to a popular misconception, she is not a relative of fellow actor Dick Van Dyke.

Career

Acting
Her feature film debut was as a night-club dancer in Deadly Addiction (1988). She also starred as Joan of Arc in an episode of Life Goes On (1990).

References 

American television actresses
American film actresses
Place of birth missing (living people)
Living people
City College of San Francisco alumni
1970 births
21st-century American singers
21st-century American women singers